Lolong (International title: Crocodile Whisperer) is a Philippine television drama action series broadcast by GMA Network. Directed by Rommel P. Penesa, it stars Ruru Madrid in the title role. It premiered on July 4, 2022 on the network's Telebabad line up replacing First Lady.

Cast and characters

Lead cast
 Ruru Madrid as Rolando "Lolong" Candelaria

Supporting cast
 Christopher de Leon as Governor Armando Banson 
 Jean Garcia as Donatella "Dona" Banson
 Shaira Diaz as Elsie Dominguez
 Arra San Agustin as Isabella "Bella" Melendez
 Paul Salas as Martin Candelaria / Martin Banson
 Rochelle Pangilinan as Karina Marabe 
 Bembol Roco as Narciso "Narsing" Candelaria
 Malou de Guzman as Isabelita "Isabel" Candelaria
 Mikoy Morales as Victoriano "Bokyo" Dela Cruz
 Ian de Leon as Lucas Morales
 DJ Durano as Alberto "Abet" Dominguez
 Marco Alcaraz as Mayor Marco Mendrano
 Maui Taylor as Kapitana Dolores Baticusin

Guest cast
 Leandro Baldemor as Raul Candelaria
 Priscilla Almeda as Gloria Candelaria
 Pokwang as Coring
 Sue Prado as Riza dela Torre
 Luke Conde as Benjo Dominguez
 Vin Abrenica as Diego
 Thea Tolentino as Celia
 Alma Concepcion as Ines Candelaria 
 Lucho Ayala as Victor
 Rafael Rosell as Fr. Reyes
 Ryan Eigenmann as Delfin
 Mon Confiado as Luciano

Production
Broadcaster Jessica Soho came up for the series' concept of conflict between humans and crocodile, which was featured in her show Kapuso Mo, Jessica Soho. Lolong is named after a crocodile of the same name, which was known as the world's largest crocodile in captivity.

In October 2020, Filipino actress Sanya Lopez left the series due to joining the drama series First Yaya. Kim Domingo was also initially attached to appear in the series. Principal photography commenced in July 2021 in Quezon. It was halted in August 2021 due to the enhanced community quarantine in National Capital Region caused by the COVID-19 pandemic.

Episodes

Accolades

References

External links
 
 

2022 Philippine television series debuts
Filipino-language television shows
GMA Network drama series
Philippine action television series
Television productions postponed due to the COVID-19 pandemic
Television series about animals
Television shows set in the Philippines